Lucknow Super Giants is a franchise cricket team based in Lucknow, Uttar Pradesh. They play in the Indian Premier League (IPL); the team's debut season was the 2022 edition of the IPL.

The team is owned by RPSG Group and was captained by KL Rahul and coached by Andy Flower in 2022.

Background
As an expansion team, the franchise were able to add three players ahead of the 2022 mega-auction. The three players drafted were KL Rahul for 17 crore, Marcus Stoinis for 9.2 crore and leg-spinner Ravi Bishnoi for 4 crore. After these acquisitions the franchise was left with 59.8 crores ahead of the auction.

The team signed an additional 18 players at the auction. The most expensive addition to the squad was pace bowler Avesh Khan who became the most expensive uncapped player when Lucknow selected him for 10 crores.

Added Marcus Stoinis, KL Rahul, Ravi Bishnoi
Acquired during the auction Deepak Hooda, Jason Holder, Manish Pandey, Quinton de Kock, Krunal Pandya, Mark Wood, Avesh Khan, Ankit Singh Rajpoot, Krishnappa Gowtham, Dushmanta Chameera, Shahbaz Nadeem, Manan Vohra, Mohsin Khan, Ayush Badoni, Kyle Mayers, Karan Sharma, Evin Lewis, Mayank Yadav.

Squad 
 Players with international caps are listed in bold.
Squad strength: 21 (14 - Indian, 7 - overseas)

Kit manufacturers and sponsors

|

Points table

Group fixtures

Playoffs

Preliminary

Eliminator

Statistics

Most runs

References 

2022 Indian Premier League